General Sir Mark Alexander Popham Carleton-Smith,  (born 9 February 1964) is a senior British Army officer. He served as Chief of the General Staff from June 2018 to June 2022, succeeding General Sir Nick Carter. He was succeeded by General Sir Patrick Sanders. He previously served as Director Special Forces and commanded 22 Special Air Service Regiment.

Early life and education
Carleton-Smith was born on 9 February 1964 in Bielefeld, West Germany, to Major General Sir Michael Carleton-Smith. He began his education at Cheltenham College Junior School, followed by Eton College, an all-boys public school. In 1982, he went up to Hatfield College, Durham to undertake an army sponsored degree in Politics and Modern history. He graduated from Durham University with a lower second class Bachelor of Arts degree in 1985.

Military career
Carleton-Smith was commissioned into the Irish Guards on 3 September 1982. He then spent three years studying at university. He was promoted to lieutenant on 6 September 1985 (with seniority from 9 April), to captain on 9 April 1989, and to major on 30 September 1995. After operational service in Northern Ireland during the Troubles, he was deployed to the Gulf War in 1991, and then saw active service as an SAS squadron commander in Bosnia later in the 1990s.

Carleton-Smith became Chief of Staff of 19 Mechanized Brigade in 1999 and served as Chief of Staff HQ Multi-National Brigade Centre during the Kosovo War later that year. In recognition of his service in Kosovo, he was appointed a Member of the Order of the British Empire in the 2000 New Year Honours, and was awarded the Queen's Commendation for Valuable Service on 3 November 2000.

Promoted to lieutenant colonel on 30 June 2001, Carleton-Smith became Military Assistant to the Commander-in-Chief, Land Forces. He became Commanding Officer of 22 Special Air Service Regiment in 2002 and in that role saw service during the 2003 invasion of Iraq and also during operations in Afghanistan. He was advanced to Officer of the Order of the British Empire in recognition of his services during the 2003 invasion of Iraq on 23 April 2004. Promoted to colonel on 30 June 2005, he became Deputy Director Policy Planning at the Ministry of Defence at that time.

Promoted to brigadier on 31 December 2006 with seniority from 30 June 2006, Carleton-Smith became commander of 16 Air Assault Brigade that year and was deployed to Afghanistan as commander of Task Force Helmand and Commander of British Forces there in April 2008. In August 2008 he led Operation Eagle's Summit, which involved a daring foray into Taliban territory. He was advanced to Commander of the Order of the British Empire for his services in Afghanistan on 6 March 2009.

Carleton-Smith became Director of Army Plans and Resources at the Ministry of Defence in January 2009 and, following promotion to major general on 20 February 2012, he became Director Special Forces. In July 2022, the BBC published a report alleging evidence that "SAS operatives in Afghanistan repeatedly killed detainees and unarmed men in suspicious circumstances," while Carleton-Smith, then Director Special Forces, "failed to pass on evidence to [the] murder inquiry" which was being conducted by the Royal Military Police. 

He was appointed Director of Strategy at the Army Headquarters in March 2015. He became Deputy Chief of the Defence Staff (Military Strategy and Operations) on 18 April 2016 and was promoted to lieutenant general with effect from that same date. On 11 June 2018 he was promoted to general and succeeded General Sir Nick Carter as Chief of the General Staff. He was appointed a Knight Commander of the Order of the Bath in the 2019 New Year Honours. Carleton-Smith was succeeded as Chief of the General Staff by General Sir Patrick Sanders in June 2022.

Carleton-Smith became Regimental Lieutenant Colonel of the Irish Guards on 18 March 2012, and resigned after ten years in late 2022. He was Honorary Colonel of Oxford University Officers Training Corps between February 2017 and June 2022.

Personal life
Carleton-Smith married Catherine Nalder in 1991. They have a son and a daughter. He is a member of Pratt's, the Pilgrims Society and the Chelsea Arts Club.

References

|-

|-

1964 births
Alumni of Hatfield College, Durham
British Army generals
British Army personnel of the Iraq War
British Army personnel of the War in Afghanistan (2001–2021)
Commanders of the Order of the British Empire
Irish Guards officers
Knights Commander of the Order of the Bath
Living people
People educated at Eton College
Recipients of the Commendation for Valuable Service
Special Air Service officers